Ari Nathan (born August 31, 1972) is an American former professional tennis player.

Born in Los Angeles, Nathan played college tennis while studying at Pepperdine University in the early 1990s. He was an All-American for doubles in 1993 and graduated in 1994, after which he competed briefly on the professional tour.

Nathan had the most impact on tour as a doubles player, with a best ranking of 166 in the world and his ATP Tour main draw appearances including the quarter-finals of Schenectady in 1994. He had a highest ranking of 540 in singles and featured in the singles qualifying draw for the 1995 Australian Open.

Challenger titles

Doubles: (1)

References

External links
 
 

1972 births
Living people
American male tennis players
Pepperdine Waves men's tennis players
Tennis players from Los Angeles
20th-century American people
21st-century American people